Przytoczna  (German: Prittisch) is a village in Międzyrzecz County, Lubusz Voivodeship, in western Poland. It is the seat of the gmina (administrative district) called Gmina Przytoczna.

The village has a population of 2,400.

Before 1945, the village belonged to Germany.

References

Przytoczna